Thomas Storey (23 November 1914 – ?) was an English professional association footballer who played as a winger.

References

1914 births
Year of death missing
People from Colne
English footballers
Association football wingers
Burnley F.C. players
Nelson F.C. players
Darwen F.C. players
Accrington Stanley F.C. (1891) players
English Football League players